Major General Robert Montresor Rogers,  (4 September 1834 – 5 February 1895) was a British Army officer and an Irish recipient of the Victoria Cross, the highest award for gallantry in the face of the enemy that can be awarded to British and Commonwealth forces.

Details
He was 25 years old, and a lieutenant in the 44th Regiment of Foot, British Army during the Second Opium War when the following deed took place for which he was awarded the VC.

On 21 August 1860 at the Taku Forts, China, Lieutenant Rogers, together with a private (John McDougall) of his regiment and a lieutenant of the 67th Regiment (Edmund Henry Lenon) displayed great gallantry in swimming the ditches and entering the North Taku Fort by an embrasure during the assault.

His citation reads:

Further information
He later achieved the rank of major general. He died in Maidenhead, Berkshire, 5 February 1895 and he is buried in the churchyard at All Saints church, Boyne Hill, Maidenhead.

His Medal is displayed at the "Du Monde Traigue" Museum in Brussels.

References

External links
Location of grave and VC medal (Berkshire)
http://www.lightinfantry.org.uk/regiments/perth/perth_co.htm

1834 births
1895 deaths
Burials in Berkshire
19th-century Irish people
Irish officers in the British Army
Military personnel from Dublin (city)
Irish recipients of the Victoria Cross
British Army major generals
Companions of the Order of the Bath
British Army personnel of the Second Opium War
British Army personnel of the Crimean War
British Army personnel of the Anglo-Zulu War
44th Regiment of Foot officers
Cameronians officers
British Army recipients of the Victoria Cross